The Merrill Shell Bank Light was a screw-pile lighthouse which once stood on its eponymous shoal in the Mississippi Sound, west of Cat Island and south of Pass Christian, Mississippi. It was replaced by a skeleton tower on the same foundation.

History
The shoal was first marked by a lightship beginning in 1847, but this was replaced by a screw-pile light in 1860. The light was extinguished by the Confederates but was undamaged, and was re-lit in 1863. The house was damaged by fire in 1880, and was utterly destroyed in 1883 by another fire; it was rebuilt the same year. In 1932 it was automated, and in 1945 the house was removed and replaced by a skeleton tower on the same foundation. This tower was damaged by the hurricanes of 2005 and was discontinued in 2007.

References

Lighthouses in Mississippi
Lighthouses completed in 1860
1860 establishments in Mississippi
Buildings and structures demolished in 1883
Buildings and structures completed in 1883
Buildings and structures demolished in 1945
Buildings and structures in Harrison County, Mississippi